The Colorado Rockies' 2012 season was the franchise's 20th in Major League Baseball. It involved the Rockies' 18th season of playing their home games at Coors Field.

Offseason
November 30, 2011: Chris Iannetta was traded by the Colorado Rockies to the Los Angeles Angels of Anaheim for Tyler Chatwood.
November 30, 2011: Ramón Hernández was signed as a free agent by the Colorado Rockies.
December 7, 2011: Huston Street was traded by the Colorado Rockies to the San Diego Padres for a player to be named later.  The San Diego Padres sent Nick Schmidt (minors) (December 9, 2011) to complete the trade.
December 8, 2011: Ian Stewart was traded by the Colorado Rockies with Casey Weathers (minors) to the Chicago Cubs for Tyler Colvin and DJ LeMahieu.
December 16, 2011: Michael Cuddyer was signed as a free agent by the Colorado Rockies.
January 16, 2012: Seth Smith was traded by the Colorado Rockies to the Oakland Athletics for Guillermo Moscoso and Josh Outman.
January 18, 2012: Jamie Moyer was signed as a free agent by the Colorado Rockies.
January 21, 2012: Marco Scutaro was traded by the Boston Red Sox to the Colorado Rockies for Clayton Mortensen.
February 6, 2012: Jeremy Guthrie was traded by the Baltimore Orioles to the Colorado Rockies for Jason Hammel and Matt Lindstrom.

Regular season

Season standings

NL West standings

NL Wild Card

Record vs. opponents

Transactions
June 4, 2012: Jamie Moyer was released by the Colorado Rockies.
June 8, 2012: Jeff Francis was signed as a free agent by the Colorado Rockies.
June 12, 2012: Esmil Rogers was sold by the Colorado Rockies to the Cleveland Indians.
July 20, 2012: Jeremy Guthrie was traded by the Colorado Rockies to the Kansas City Royals for Jonathan Sánchez.
July 27, 2012: Marco Scutaro was traded by the Colorado Rockies to the San Francisco Giants for Charlie Culberson.

Major League Debuts
Batters
Josh Rutledge (Jul 13)
Matt McBride (Aug 4)
Rafael Ortega (Sep 30)
Pitchers
Christian Friedrich (May 9)
Edwar Cabrera (Jun 27)
Will Harris (Aug 13)
Rob Scahill (Sep 11)

Roster

Game log 

|-  bgcolor="ffbbbb"
|- align="center" bgcolor="bbffbb"
| 1 || April 6 || @ Astros || 5–3 || Guthrie (1–0) || Rodriguez (0–1) || Betancourt (1) || 43,464 || 1–0
|- align="center" bgcolor="ffbbbb"
| 2 || April 7 || @ Astros || 7–3 || Harrell (1–0) || Moyer (0–1) || || 23,962 || 1–1
|- align="center" bgcolor="ffbbbb"
| 3 || April 8 || @ Astros || 3–2 || López (1–0) || Brothers (0–1) || Myers (1) || 14,195 || 1–2
|- align="center" bgcolor="ffbbbb"
| 4 || April 9 || Giants || 7–0 || Zito (1–0) || Chacín (0–1) || || 49,282 || 1–3
|- align="center" bgcolor="bbffbb"
| 5 || April 11 || Giants || 17–8 || Reynolds (1–0) || Mota (0–1) || Chatwood (1) || 30,337 || 2–3
|- align="center" bgcolor="ffbbbb"
| 6 || April 12 || Giants || 4–2 || Bumgarner (1–1) || Moyer (0–2) || Wilson (1) || 25,860 || 2–4
|- align="center" bgcolor="bbffbb"
| 7 || April 13 || Diamondbacks || 7–6 || Brothers (1–1) || Shaw (0–1) || Betancourt (2) || 30,642 || 3–4
|- align="center" bgcolor="bbffbb"
| 8 || April 14 || Diamondbacks || 8–7 || Chatwood (1–0) || Putz (0–1) || || 29,856 || 4–4
|- align="center" bgcolor="ffbbbb"
| 9 || April 15 || Diamondbacks || 5–2 || Cahill (1–0) || Pomeranz (0–1) || Shaw (2) || 26,952 || 4–5
|- align="center" bgcolor="ffbbbb"
| 10 || April 16 || Padres || 7–1 || Luebke (1–1) || Guthrie (1–1) || || 21,547 || 4–6
|- align="center" bgcolor="bbffbb"
| 11 || April 17 || Padres || 5–3 || Moyer (1–2) || Bass (0–2) || Betancourt (3) || 24,525 || 5–6
|- align="center" bgcolor="bbffbb"
| 12 || April 18 || Padres || 8–4 || Nicasio (1–0) || Richard (1–1) || || 24,762 || 6–6
|- align="center" bgcolor="bbffbb"
| 13 || April 20 || @ Brewers || 4–3 || Belisle (1–0) || Axford (0–1) || Betancourt (4) || 39,188 || 7–6
|- align="center" bgcolor="ffbbbb"
| 14 || April 21 || @ Brewers || 9–4 || Veras (2–0) || Rogers (0–1) || || 43,565 || 7–7
|- align="center" bgcolor="bbffbb"
| 15 || April 22 || @ Brewers || 4–1 || Guthrie (2–1) || Rodríguez (0–2) || Betancourt (5) || 42,611 || 8–7
|- align="center" bgcolor="bbbbbb"
| – || April 23 || @ Pirates || colspan=6 | Postponed (rain) Rescheduled for April 25
|- align="center" bgcolor="ffbbbb"
| 16 || April 24 || @ Pirates || 5–4 || Watson (1–0) || Belisle (1–1) || Hanrahan (3) || 10,484 || 8–8
|- align="center" bgcolor="bbffbb"
| 17 || April 25 || @ Pirates || 2–1 || Reynolds (2–0) || Resop (0–2) || Betancourt (6) || || 9–8
|- align="center" bgcolor="ffbbbb"
| 18 || April 25 || @ Pirates || 5–1 || Morton (1–1) || Chacín (0–2) || || 15,218 || 9–9
|- align="center" bgcolor="bbffbb"
| 19 || April 27 || Mets || 18–9 || Reynolds (3–0) || Acosta (0–1) || || 35,103 || 10–9
|- align="center" bgcolor="ffbbbb"
| 20 || April 28 || Mets || 7–5 || Gee (2–2) || Moscoso (0–1) || Francisco (5) || 38,798 || 10–10
|- align="center" bgcolor="ffbbbb"
| 21 || April 29 || Mets || 6–5 (11) || Francisco (1–1) || Belisle (1–2) || Ramírez (1) || 36,690 || 10–11
|- align="center" bgcolor="bbffbb"
| 22 || April 30 || Dodgers || 6–2 || Nicasio (2–0) || Harang (1–2) || || 25,227 || 11–11
|-

|-  bgcolor="ffbbbb"
|- align="center" bgcolor="ffbbbb"
| 23 || May 1 || Dodgers || 7–6 || Lilly (3–0) || Chacín (0–3) || Guerra (8) || 26,211 || 11–12
|- align="center" bgcolor="bbffbb"
| 24 || May 2 || Dodgers || 8–5 || Betancourt (1–0) || Wright (1–1) || || 30,276 || 12–12
|- align="center" bgcolor="ffbbbb"
| 25 || May 4 || Braves || 9–8 (11) || Durbin (2–0) || Escalona (0–1) || Kimbrel (9) || 33,184 || 12–13
|- align="center" bgcolor="ffbbbb"
| 26 || May 5 || Braves || 13–9 || Martínez (2–0) || Rogers (0–2) || Hernández (1) || 40,013 || 12–14
|- align="center" bgcolor="ffbbbb"
| 27 || May 6 || Braves || 7–2 || Beachy (3–1) || Nicasio (2–1) || Martínez (1) || 45,330 || 12–15
|- align="center" bgcolor="ffbbbb"
| 28 || May 7 || @ Padres || 3–2 || Vólquez (1–2) || Pomeranz (0–2) || Thayer (1) || 15,895 || 12–16
|- align="center" bgcolor="ffbbbb"
| 29 || May 8 || @ Padres || 3–1 || Suppan (2–0) || White (0–1) || Thayer (2) || 17,478 || 12–17
|- align="center" bgcolor="bbffbb"
| 30 || May 9 || @ Padres || 6–2 || Friedrich (1–0) || Bass (1–4) || || 20,059 || 13–17
|- align="center" bgcolor="ffbbbb"
| 31 || May 11 || @ Dodgers || 7–3 || Capuano (5–0) || Moyer (1–3) || || 35,591 || 13–18
|- align="center" bgcolor="ffbbbb"
| 32 || May 12 || @ Dodgers || 2–1 || Harang (2–2) || Outman (0–1) || Jansen (3) || 33,735 || 13–19
|- align="center" bgcolor="ffbbbb"
| 33 || May 13 || @ Dodgers || 11–5 || Lilly (5–0) || White (0–2) || || 49,124 || 13–20
|- align="center" bgcolor="ffbbbb"
| 34 || May 14 || @ Giants || 3–2 || Romo (2–0) || Brothers (1–2) || Casilla (8) || 41,254 || 13–21
|- align="center" bgcolor="bbffbb"
| 35 || May 15 || @ Giants || 5–4 || Brothers (2–2) || Casilla (0–2) || Betancourt (7) || 41,332 || 14–21
|- align="center" bgcolor="bbffbb"
| 36 || May 16 || Diamondbacks || 6–1 || Moyer (2–3) || Corbin (2–2) || || 32,162 || 15–21
|- align="center" bgcolor="ffbbbb"
| 37 || May 17 || Diamondbacks || 9–7 || Ziegler (2–1) || Betancourt (1–1) || Putz (7) || 32,035 || 15–22
|- align="center" bgcolor="ffbbbb"
| 38 || May 18 || Mariners || 4–0 || Millwood (2–4) || White (0–3) || || 34,887 || 15–23
|- align="center" bgcolor="ffbbbb"
| 39 || May 19 || Mariners || 10–3 || Vargas (5–3) || Friedrich (1–1) || || 30,784 || 15–24
|- align="center" bgcolor="ffbbbb"
| 40 || May 20 || Mariners || 6–4 || Beavan (2–4) || Guthrie (2–2) || || 36,662 || 15–25
|- align="center" bgcolor="ffbbbb"
| 41 || May 21 || @ Marlins || 7–4 || Buehrle (4–4) || Moyer (2–4) || Bell (6) || 25,155 || 15–26
|- align="center" bgcolor="ffbbbb"
| 42 || May 22 || @ Marlins || 7–6 || Nolasco (5–2) || Nicasio (2–2) || Bell (7) || 22,242 || 15–27
|- align="center" bgcolor="bbffbb"
| 43 || May 23 || @ Marlins || 8–4 || White (1–3) || Zambrano (2–3) || || 23,985 || 16–27
|- align="center" bgcolor="bbffbb"
| 44 || May 25 || @ Reds || 6–3 || Friedrich (2–1) || Cueto (5–2) || Betancourt (8) || 29,597 || 17–27
|- align="center" bgcolor="ffbbbb"
| 45 || May 26 || @ Reds || 10–3 || Hoover (1–0) || Guthrie (2–3) || || 35,314 || 17–28
|- align="center" bgcolor="ffbbbb"
| 46 || May 27 || @ Reds || 7–5 || Latos (4–2) || Moyer (2–5) || Chapman (3) || 29,368 || 17–29
|- align="center" bgcolor="bbffbb"
| 47 || May 28 || Astros || 9–7 || Belisle (2–2) || Rodriguez (1–5) || Betancourt (9) || 34,546 || 18–29
|- align="center" bgcolor="bbffbb"
| 48 || May 28 || Astros || 7–6 (10) || Roenicke (1–0) || Myers (0–2) || || 35,786 || 19–29
|- align="center" bgcolor="bbffbb"
| 49 || May 30 || Astros || 13–5 || Friedrich (3–1) || Harrell (4–4) || || 28,102 || 20–29
|- align="center" bgcolor="bbffbb"
| 50 || May 31 || Astros || 11–5 || Guthrie (3–3) || Norris (5–2) || || 31,799 || 21–29
|-

|-  bgcolor="ffbbbb"
|- align="center" bgcolor="bbffbb"
| 51 || June 1 || Dodgers || 13–3 || Ottavino (1–0) || Capuano (7–2) || || 36,795 || 22–29
|- align="center" bgcolor="ffbbbb"
| 52 || June 2 || Dodgers || 6–2 || Harang (4–3) || Nicasio (2–3) || || 36,175 || 22–30
|- align="center" bgcolor="bbffbb"
| 53 || June 3 || Dodgers || 3–2 || White (2–3) || Eovaldi (0–2) || Betancourt (10) || 35,353 || 23–30
|- align="center" bgcolor="bbffbb"
| 54 || June 5 || @ Diamondbacks || 4–0 || Friedrich (4–1) || Saunders (3–4) || || 22,881 || 24–30
|- align="center" bgcolor="ffbbbb"
| 55 || June 6 || @ Diamondbacks || 10–0 || Kennedy (5–5) || Guthrie (3–4) || || 22,322 || 24–31
|- align="center" bgcolor="ffbbbb"
| 56 || June 7 || @ Diamondbacks || 6–1 || Miley (7–2) || Outman (0–2) || || 23,069 || 24–32
|- align="center" bgcolor="ffbbbb"
| 57 || June 8 || Angels || 7–2 || Wilson (7–4) || White (2–4) || || 41,814 || 24–33
|- align="center" bgcolor="ffbbbb"
| 58 || June 9 || Angels || 11–5 || Haren (4–6) || Francis (0–1) || || 37,801 || 24–34
|- align="center" bgcolor="ffbbbb"
| 59 || June 10 || Angels || 10–8 || Santana (3–7) || Friedrich (4–2) || Downs (6) || 37,722 || 24–35
|- align="center" bgcolor="ffbbbb"
| 60 || June 12 || Athletics || 8–5 || Colón (6–6) || Guthrie (3–5) || Cook (1) || 33,635 || 24–36
|- align="center" bgcolor="ffbbbb"
| 61 || June 13 || Athletics || 10–8 || Blevins (1–0) || Betancourt (1–2) || Cook (2) || 32,155 || 24–37
|- align="center" bgcolor="ffbbbb"
| 62 || June 14 || Athletics || 8–2 || Parker (3–3) || White (2–5) || || 32,527 || 24–38
|- align="center" bgcolor="bbffbb"
| 63 || June 15 || @ Tigers || 12–4 (10) || Belisle (3–2) || Valverde (3–2) || || 41,878 || 25–38
|- align="center" bgcolor="ffbbbb"
| 64 || June 16 || @ Tigers || 4–1 || Fister (1–3) || Friedrich (4–3) || || 41,800 || 25–39
|- align="center" bgcolor="ffbbbb"
| 65 || June 17 || @ Tigers || 5–0 || Scherzer (6–4) || Guthrie (3–6) || || 40,619 || 25–40
|- align="center" bgcolor="ffbbbb"
| 66 || June 19 || @ Phillies || 7–2 || Hamels (10–3) || Outman (0–3) || || 44,329 || 25–41
|- align="center" bgcolor="ffbbbb"
| 67 || June 20 || @ Phillies || 7–6 || Papelbon (1–2) || Betancourt (1–3) || || 43,729 || 25–42
|- align="center" bgcolor="bbffbb"
| 68 || June 21 || @ Phillies || 4–1 || Roenicke (2–0) || Worley (3–4) || Betancourt (11) || 43,805 || 26–42
|- align="center" bgcolor="ffbbbb"
| 69 || June 22 || @ Rangers || 4–1 || Oswalt (1–0) || Friedrich (4–4) || Nathan (16) || 46,964 || 26–43
|- align="center" bgcolor="bbffbb"
| 70 || June 23 || @ Rangers || 11–7 || Brothers (3–2) || Lewis (6–6) || || 42,516 || 27–43
|- align="center" bgcolor="ffbbbb"
| 71 || June 24 || @ Rangers || 4–2 || Harrison (10–3) || White (2–6) || || 45,407 || 27–44
|- align="center" bgcolor="bbffbb"
| 72 || June 25 || Nationals || 4–2 || Roenicke (3–0) || Strasburg (9–2) || Betancourt (12) || 40,177 || 28–44
|- align="center" bgcolor="ffbbbb"
| 73 || June 26 || Nationals || 12–5 || Gonzalez (10–3) || Friedrich (4–5) || || 36,110 || 28–45
|- align="center" bgcolor="ffbbbb"
| 74 || June 27 || Nationals || 11–5 || Zimmermann (4–6) || Cabrera (0–1) || || 36,045 || 28–46
|- align="center" bgcolor="bbffbb"
| 75 || June 28 || Nationals || 11–10 (11) || Ottavino (2–0) || Stammen (3–1) || || 33,957 || 29–46
|- align="center" bgcolor="bbffbb"
| 76 || June 29 || Padres || 10–2 || Francis (1–1) || Marquis (3–8) || || 42,785 || 30–46
|- align="center" bgcolor="ffbbbb"
| 77 || June 30 || Padres || 8–4 || Vólquez (5–7) || Guthrie (3–7) || || 48,169 || 30–47
|-

|-  bgcolor="ffbbbb"
|- align="center" bgcolor="ffbbbb"
| 78 || July 1 || Padres || 2–0 || Wells (1–1) || Pomeranz (0–3) || Street (12) || 31,829 || 30–48
|- align="center" bgcolor="ffbbbb"
| 79 || July 2 || @ Cardinals || 9–3 || Lohse (8–2) || Chatwood (1–1) || || 39,456 || 30–49
|- align="center" bgcolor="bbffbb"
| 80 || July 3 || @ Cardinals || 3–2 || Francis (2–1) || Kelly (1–1) || Betancourt (13) || 41,701 || 31–49
|- align="center" bgcolor="ffbbbb"
| 81 || July 4 || @ Cardinals || 4–1 || Wainwright (7–8) || Guthrie (3–8) || Motte (18) || 42,338 || 31–50
|- align="center" bgcolor="ffbbbb"
| 82 || July 5 || @ Cardinals || 6–2 || Lynn (11–4) || Friedrich (4–6) || Motte (19) || 41,751 || 31–51
|- align="center" bgcolor="bbffbb"
| 83 || July 6 || @ Nationals || 5–1 || Pomeranz (1–3) || Strasburg (9–4) || Betancourt (14) || 28,951 || 32–51
|- align="center" bgcolor="ffbbbb"
| 84 || July 7 || @ Nationals || 4–1 || Gonzalez (12–3) || Francis (2–2) || Clippard (14) || 28,032 || 32–52
|- align="center" bgcolor="bbffbb"
| 85 || July 8 || @ Nationals || 4–3 || Brothers (4–2) || Clippard (2–3) || Betancourt (15) || 25,125 || 33–52
|- align="center" bgcolor="bbffbb"
| 86 || July 13 || Phillies || 6–2 || Friedrich (5–6) || Lee (1–6) ||  || 33,346 || 34–52
|- align="center" bgcolor="ffbbbb"
| 87 || July 14 || Phillies || 8–5 || Worley (5–5) || Guthrie (3–9) || Papelbon (19) || 35,151 || 34–53
|- align="center" bgcolor="ffbbbb"
| 88 || July 15 || Phillies || 5–1 || Hamels (11–4) || Pomeranz (1–4) ||  || 25,685 || 34–54
|- align="center" bgcolor="bbffbb"
| 89 || July 16 || Pirates || 5–4 || Brothers (5–2) || Grilli (1–3) || || 36,907 || 35–54
|- align="center" bgcolor="ffbbbb"
| 90 || July 17 || Pirates || 6–2 || Bédard (5–10) || Friedrich (5–7) || Hanrahan (25) || 42,574 || 35–55
|- align="center" bgcolor="ffbbbb"
| 91 || July 18 || Pirates || 9–6 || McDonald (10–3) || Reynolds (3–1) || Hanrahan (26) || 30,842 || 35–56
|- align="center" bgcolor="ffbbbb"
| 92 || July 20 || @ Padres || 9–5 || Marquis (5–9) || Pomeranz (1–5) || || 25,507 || 35–57
|- align="center" bgcolor="bbffbb"
| 93 || July 21 || @ Padres || 8–6 (12) || Torres (1–0) || Thatcher (0–3) || Betancourt (16) || 37,174 || 36–57
|- align="center" bgcolor="ffbbbb"
| 94 || July 22 || @ Padres || 3–2 || Thayer (2–2) || Ottavino (2–1) || Street (16) || 25,198 || 36–58
|- align="center" bgcolor="ffbbbb"
| 95 || July 23 || @ Diamondbacks || 6–3 || Kennedy (8–8) || Sánchez (1–7) || Putz (18) || 20,056 || 36–59
|- align="center" bgcolor="ffbbbb"
| 96 || July 24 || @ Diamondbacks || 6–2 || Saunders (5–6) || Cabrera (0–2) || || 20,432 || 36–60
|- align="center" bgcolor="bbffbb"
| 97 || July 25 || @ Diamondbacks || 4–2 || Francis (3–2) || Cahill (8–9) || Betancourt (17) || 23,385 || 37–60
|- align="center" bgcolor="ffbbbb"
| 98 || July 27 || Reds || 3–0 || Arroyo (6–6) || Pomeranz (1–6) || Chapman (20) || 38,214 || 37–61
|- align="center" bgcolor="ffbbbb"
| 99 || July 28 || Reds || 9–7 || Cueto (13–5) || Friedrich (5–8) || Chapman (21) || 42,826 || 37–62
|- align="center" bgcolor="ffbbbb"
| 100 || July 29 || Reds || 7–2 || Latos (9–3) || Sánchez (1–8) || || 29,430 || 37–63
|- align="center" bgcolor="ffbbbb"
| 101 || July 31 || Cardinals || 11–6 || Lohse (11–2) || Francis (3–3) || || 31,297 || 37–64
|-

|-  bgcolor="ffbbbb"
|- align="center" bgcolor="ffbbbb"
| 102 || August 1 || Cardinals || 9–6 || Westbrook (10–8) || Belisle (3–3) || || 29,547 || 37–65
|- align="center" bgcolor="bbffbb"
| 103 || August 2 || Cardinals || 8–2 || Brothers (6–2) || Salas (1–4) || || 29,659 || 38–65
|- align="center" bgcolor="ffbbbb"
| 104 || August 3 || Giants || 16–4 || Vogelsong (9–5) || Sánchez (1–9) || || 30,176 || 38–66
|- align="center" bgcolor="ffbbbb"
| 105 || August 4 || Giants || 11–6 || Bumgarner (12–6) || Francis (3–4) || || 35,242 || 38–67
|- align="center" bgcolor="ffbbbb"
| 106 || August 5 || Giants || 8–3 || Lincecum (6–11) || Chatwood (1–2) || || 28,804 || 38–68
|- align="center" bgcolor="bbffbb"
| 107 || August 6 || @ Dodgers || 2–0 || Ottavino (3–1) || Capuano (10–8) || Betancourt (18) || 32,659 || 39–68
|- align="center" bgcolor="bbffbb"
| 108 || August 7 || @ Dodgers || 3–1 || Roenicke (4–0) || Harang (7–7) || Betancourt (19) || 55,024 || 40–68
|- align="center" bgcolor="ffbbbb"
| 109 || August 8 || @ Dodgers || 6–4 || Billingsley (8–9) || Torres (1–1) || Jansen (22) || 37,084 || 40–69
|- align="center" bgcolor="bbffbb"
| 110 || August 10 || @ Giants || 3–0 || Chatwood (2–2) || Lincecum (6–12) || Betancourt (20) || 41,729 || 41–69
|- align="center" bgcolor="ffbbbb"
| 111 || August 11 || @ Giants || 9–3 || Cain (11–5) || Pomeranz (1–7) || || 42,483 || 41–70
|- align="center" bgcolor="ffbbbb"
| 112 || August 12 || @ Giants || 9–6 || Hensley (4–3) || Belisle (3–4) || || 41,492 || 41–71
|- align="center" bgcolor="bbffbb"
| 113 || August 13 || Brewers || 9–6 || Francis (4–4) || Fiers (6–5) || || 26,821 || 42–71
|- align="center" bgcolor="bbffbb"
| 114 || August 14 || Brewers || 8–6 || Chatwood (3–2) || Wolf (3–9) || Betancourt (21) || 28,036 || 43–71
|- align="center" bgcolor="bbffbb"
| 115 || August 15 || Brewers || 7–6 || Harris (1–0) || Henderson (0–2) || || 23,411 || 44–71
|- align="center" bgcolor="bbffbb"
| 116 || August 16 || Marlins || 5–3 || Ottavino (4–1) || Nolasco (9–12) || Betancourt (22) || 24,807 || 45–71
|- align="center" bgcolor="ffbbbb"
| 117 || August 17 || Marlins || 6–5 || LeBlanc (2–2) || Roenicke (4–1) || Cishek (8) || 25,614 || 45–72
|- align="center" bgcolor="ffbbbb"
| 118 || August 18 || Marlins || 6–5 || Eovaldi (4–8) || Chatwood (3–3) || Cishek (9) || 30,426 || 45–73
|- align="center" bgcolor="bbffbb"
| 119 || August 19 || Marlins || 3–2 || Ottavino (5–1) || Johnson (7–10) || Betancourt (23) || 43,961 || 46–73
|- align="center" bgcolor="bbffbb"
| 120 || August 20 || @ Mets || 3–1 || Brothers (7–2) || Edgin (1–1) || Betancourt (24) || 23,833 || 47–73
|- align="center" bgcolor="bbffbb"
| 121 || August 21 || @ Mets || 6–2 || Chacín (1–3) || Young (3–7) || || 27,633 || 48–73
|- align="center" bgcolor="bbffbb"
| 122 || August 22 || @ Mets || 5–2 || Torres (2–1) || Ramírez (2–3) || Betancourt (25) || 22,204 || 49–73
|- align="center" bgcolor="bbffbb"
| 123 || August 23 || @ Mets || 1–0 || Brothers (8–2) || Parnell (2–3) || Belisle (1) || 22,544 || 50–73
|- align="center" bgcolor="ffbbbb"
| 124 || August 24 || @ Cubs || 5–3 || Russell (6–1) || Belisle (3–5) || Mármol (16) || 31,255 || 50–74
|- align="center" bgcolor="bbffbb"
| 125 || August 25 || @ Cubs || 4–3 || Torres (3–1) || Corpas (0–1) || Betancourt (26) || 35,296 || 51–74
|- align="center" bgcolor="ffbbbb"
| 126 || August 26 || @ Cubs || 5–0 (8) || Volstad (1–9) || Chacín (1–4) || Camp (2) || 32,346 || 51–75
|- align="center" bgcolor="bbffbb"
| 127 || August 27 || Dodgers || 10–0 || Francis (5–4) || Beckett (5–12) || Belisle (2) || 30,148 || 52–75
|- align="center" bgcolor="bbffbb"
| 128 || August 28 || Dodgers || 8–4 || Chatwood (4–3) || Capuano (11–10) || || 28,368 || 53–75
|- align="center" bgcolor="ffbbbb"
| 129 || August 29 || Dodgers || 10–8 || Blanton (9–12) || Pomeranz (1–8) || Belisario (1) || 25,155 || 53–76
|- align="center" bgcolor="ffbbbb"
| 130 || August 31 || Padres || 5–4 || Richard (12–12) || White (2–7) || Gregerson (3) || 27,366 || 53–77
|-

|-  bgcolor="ffbbbb"
|- align="center" bgcolor="bbffbb"
| 131 || September 1 || Padres || 9–1 || Chacín (2–4) || Vólquez (9–10) || || 30,152 || 54–77
|- align="center" bgcolor="bbffbb"
| 132 || September 2 || Padres || 11–10 || Moscoso (1–1) || Brach (1–4) || Betancourt (27) || 30,678 || 55–77
|- align="center" bgcolor="ffbbbb"
| 133 || September 3 || @ Braves || 6–1 || Medlen (7–1) || Chatwood (4–4) || || 24,848 || 55–78
|- align="center" bgcolor="bbffbb"
| 134 || September 4 || @ Braves || 6–0 || Torres (4–1) || Hanson (12–8) || || 16,686 || 56–78
|- align="center" bgcolor="ffbbbb"
| 135 || September 5 || @ Braves || 1–0 || Minor (8–10) || White (2–8) || Kimbrel (33) || 16,714 || 56–79
|- align="center" bgcolor="ffbbbb"
| 136 || September 6 || @ Braves || 1–0 || Hudson (14–5) || Chacín (2–5) || Kimbrel (34) || 19,313 || 56–80
|- align="center" bgcolor="ffbbbb"
| 137 || September 7 || @ Phillies || 3–2 || Papelbon (4–6) || Harris (1–1) ||  || 42,028 || 56–81
|- align="center" bgcolor="bbbbbb"
| – || September 8 || @ Phillies || colspan=6 | Postponed (rain)  Rescheduled for September 9
|- align="center" bgcolor="ffbbbb"
| 138 || September 9 || @ Phillies || 3–2 || Papelbon (5–6) || Belisle (3–6) || || 41,813 || 56–82
|- align="center" bgcolor="ffbbbb"
| 139 || September 9  || @ Phillies || 7–4 || Rosenberg (1–2) || Roenicke (4–2) || Papelbon (32) || 40,394 || 56–83
|- align="center" bgcolor="bbffbb"
| 140 || September 10 || Giants || 6–5 || Moscoso (2–1) || Vogelsong (12–8) || Betancourt (28) || 25,817 || 57–83
|- align="center" bgcolor="ffbbbb"
| 141 || September 11 || Giants || 9–8 || Kontos (2–1) || Torres (4–2) || López (7) || 26,631 || 57–84
|- align="center" bgcolor="ffbbbb"
| 142 || September 12 || Giants || 8–3 || Lincecum (9–14) || Francis (5–5) || || 24,182 || 57–85
|- align="center" bgcolor="bbffbb"
| 143 || September 14 || @ Padres || 7–4 || Moscoso (3–1) || Cashner (3–4) || Betancourt (29) || 25,018 || 58–85
|- align="center" bgcolor="ffbbbb"
| 144 || September 15 || @ Padres || 4–3 || Kelly (2–1) || Pomeranz (1–9) || Gregerson (8) || 27,651 || 58–86
|- align="center" bgcolor="ffbbbb"
| 145 || September 16 || @ Padres || 12–11 || Thatcher (1–4) || Belisle (3–7) || || 22,948 || 58–87
|- align="center" bgcolor="ffbbbb"
| 146 || September 17 || @ Giants || 2–1 || Bumgarner (15–10) || Moscoso (3–2) || Romo (12) || 41,280 || 58–88
|- align="center" bgcolor="ffbbbb"
| 147 || September 18 || @ Giants || 6–3 || Lincecum (10–14) || Francis (5–6) || || 41,718 || 58–89
|- align="center" bgcolor="ffbbbb"
| 148 || September 19 || @ Giants || 7–1 || Cain (15–5) || Chatwood (4–5) || || 41,292 || 58–90
|- align="center" bgcolor="ffbbbb"
| 149 || September 20 || @ Giants || 9–2 || Zito (13–8) || de la Rosa (0–1) || || 41,157 || 58–91
|- align="center" bgcolor="ffbbbb"
| 150 || September 21 || Diamondbacks || 15–5 || Miley (16–10) || White (2–9) || || 42,359 || 58–92
|- align="center" bgcolor="ffbbbb"
| 151 || September 22 || Diamondbacks || 8–7 || Bergesen (2–0) || Torres (4–3) || Putz (31) || 33,689 || 58–93
|- align="center" bgcolor="ffbbbb"
| 152 || September 23 || Diamondbacks || 10–7 || Albers (3–1) || Belisle (3–8) || Putz (32) || 32,448 || 58–94
|- align="center" bgcolor="bbffbb"
| 153 || September 24 || Diamondbacks || 4–2 ||  Chatwood (5–5) || Cahill (12–12) || Betancourt (30) || 22,277 || 59–94
|- align="center" bgcolor="bbffbb"
| 154 || September 25 || Cubs || 10–5 (7) || Torres (5–3) || Rusin (1–3) || || 26,660 || 60–94
|- align="center" bgcolor="bbffbb"
| 155 || September 26 || Cubs || 6–0 || Pomeranz (2–9) || Berken (0–2) || || 27,057 || 61–94
|- align="center" bgcolor="bbffbb"
| 156 || September 27 || Cubs || 7–5 || Chacín (3–5) || Volstad (3–11) || Betancourt (31) || 30,288 || 62–94
|- align="center" bgcolor="ffbbbb"
| 157 || September 28 || @ Dodgers || 8–0 || Kershaw (13–9) || Francis (5–7) || || 37,133 || 62–95
|- align="center" bgcolor="ffbbbb"
| 158 || September 29 || @ Dodgers || 3–0 || Blanton (10–13) || Chatwood (5–6) || League (15) || 40,724 || 62–96
|- align="center" bgcolor="ffbbbb"
| 159 || September 30 || @ Dodgers || 7–1 || Beckett (7–14) || de la Rosa (0–2) || || 35,607 || 62–97
|-

|-  bgcolor="ffbbbb"
|- align="center" bgcolor="bbffbb"
| 160 || October 1 || @ Diamondbacks || 7–5 (13) || Outman (1–3) || Bergesen (2–1) || Roenicke (1) || 24,123 || 63–97
|- align="center" bgcolor="ffbbbb"
| 161 || October 2 || @ Diamondbacks || 5–3 || Ziegler (6–1) || Betancourt (1–4) || || 22,466 || 63–98
|- align="center" bgcolor="bbffbb"
| 162 || October 3 || @ Diamondbacks || 2–1 || Francis (6–7) || Kennedy (15–12) || Belisle (3) || 24,344 || 64–98
|-

Player stats

Batting

Starters by position 
Note: Pos = Position; G = Games played; AB = At bats; H = Hits; Avg. = Batting average; HR = Home runs; RBI = Runs batted in

Other batters 
Note: G = Games played; AB = At bats; H = Hits; Avg. = Batting average; HR = Home runs; RBI = Runs batted in

Pitching

Starting pitchers 
Note: G = Games pitched; IP = Innings pitched; W = Wins; L = Losses; ERA = Earned run average; SO = Strikeouts

Other pitchers 
Note: G = Games pitched; IP = Innings pitched; W = Wins; L = Losses; ERA = Earned run average; SO = Strikeouts

Relief pitchers 
Note: G = Games pitched; W = Wins; L = Losses; SV = Saves; ERA = Earned run average; SO = Strikeouts

Farm system

LEAGUE CHAMPIONS: Asheville

References
2012 Colorado Rockies season at Baseball Reference
2012 Colorado Rockies season Official Site 

Colorado Rockies seasons
Colorado Rockies
Colorado Rockies
2010s in Denver